Pier Park is a lifestyle center in Panama City Beach, Florida. It opened in 2008 and features Dillard's, J. C. Penney, and Target as anchor stores.

History
In the late 1990s to early 2000s there was talks about an outdoor shopping complex in Panama City Beach that would be adjacent to the Gulf Front with retail stores, dining options, and a movie theatre. The Pier Park project officially broke ground in 2002 with a 5 to 6 year timeline for completion. It neared completion in late 2007 for a Spring 2008 opening date. Pier Park officially opened on February 14, 2008. Among the first stores to open were anchor stores including a Dillard's, J. C. Penney, and Target, all of which are still in operation. Other tenants include Jimmy Buffett's Margaritaville restaurant, Buffalo Wild Wings, Marble Slab Creamery, Old Navy, Nike Factory Outlet, Five Guys Burgers and Fries, Victoria's Secret and Dick's Last Resort, and a movie theater owned by Southern Theatres, The Grand 16, which features IMAX 3D as well as RealD 3D. Forever 21 opened in the former Borders Bookstore, which closed with the rest of the chain in 2011.

On January 21, 2021, Nike Factory Outlet closed its location at Pier Park.

The opening of Pier Park led to many other developments in the area, including a Walmart store, an adjacent strip mall called Pier Park West, and a second shopping center complex called Pier Park North. Pier Park West contains GameStop, Dickey's Barbecue Pit, Jimmy John's, and Chipotle. Pier Park North, completed in 2015, is home to Bealls Outlet, Five Below, Dick's Sporting Goods, Ross Dress For Less, The Fresh Market, Petsmart, Cost Plus World Market, Bed Bath & Beyond, Rooms To Go, Chili's, Texas Roadhouse, Wayback Burgers, and Jersey Mike's Subs. A fourth development Pier Park East is in the works to include an extension of the current Pier Park with more retail, an indoor family entertainment center, a hotel and residential units, although construction has yet to begin. As of 2022, there has been no further announcement regarding this project with some speculation as the ongoing COVID-19 pandemic putting this project to a halt.

References

External links
Pier Park
Panama City Beach Convention & Visitors Bureau

Buildings and structures in Bay County, Florida
Tourist attractions in Bay County, Florida
Shopping malls in Florida
Shopping malls established in 2008
Simon Property Group
Lifestyle centers (retail)
Panama City Beach, Florida
2008 establishments in Florida